The Donegal Artillery was a British Militia Artillery regiment of the 19th century (the militia had been a nominally infantry force, but had been tasked from 1852 with responsibility for manning coastal artillery batteries in wartime).  It was based in and named after County Donegal in the modern Republic of Ireland.

The regiment was raised as The Donegal Infantry Militia in 1793.  In 1855 four out of its twelve companies were converted to form The Donegal Artillery Militia. In November 1855 it assumed the title The Donegal Artillery Militia (The Prince of Wales's). 

Between September 1855 and September 1856 the unit was embodied for the Crimean War. In 1882 they were retitled the 3rd Brigade, North Irish Division, Royal Artillery.

From 2 May 1900 until 6 November 1900 the unit was embodied for the Second Boer War, sending a service company of five officers and 144 other ranks. On arrival they joined the service company of the Antrim Artillery. They departed Cape Town for return home on 7 June 1901. After the end of the war the following year, the officers of the Donegal Artillery presented to Letterkenny church a brass lectern as a memorial to some members of the regiment who died in the war.

In 1902 it was renamed The Donegal Artillery, Royal Garrison Artillery (Militia). On the creation of the Territorial Force in 1908 the unit was transferred to the Special Reserve Royal Field Artillery. It was disbanded in 1909.

References

Publications

 Litchfield, Norman E H, 1987.  The Militia Artillery 1852-1909, The Sherwood Press, Nottingham. 

Irish Militia regiments
Defunct Irish regiments of the British Army
Military units and formations established in 1793
Militia regiments of the Royal Artillery
1909 disestablishments in Ireland
1793 establishments in Ireland
Military units and formations disestablished in 1909